The 2008 FA Community Shield (also known as The FA Community Shield sponsored by McDonald's for sponsorship reasons) was the 86th staging of the FA Community Shield, an annual football match played between the reigning Premier League champions and FA Cup winners. The match was played on 10 August 2008 between 2007–08 Premier League champions Manchester United and 2007–08 FA Cup winners Portsmouth as the "curtain-raiser" to the 2008–09 English football season. The match marked the 100th year since the first Charity Shield, also won by Manchester United after a replay in August 1908.

Manchester United won the game 3–1 on penalties, after the match finished 0–0 after 90 minutes; the Community Shield no longer plays extra time if the teams are level at the end of normal time.	
	
The match was the second meeting between the two teams in the space of two weeks, after they had played each other in a friendly in Nigeria on 27 July 2008. It was also the first Community Shield since 1996 to feature a team from outside the big four of Manchester United, Chelsea, Arsenal and Liverpool. With this Community Shield title, United extended their record number of wins in the competition to 13 (17 including shared titles). As of the 2020 edition, Portsmouth manager Harry Redknapp is the most recent English to manage a team in the Community Shield.

Match details

See also
 2007–08 Premier League
 2007–08 FA Cup

Footnotes

A.  Mark Clattenburg was originally appointed as the match referee, but he was suspended over allegations of debt and replaced by Peter Walton.

References

2008
Fa Community Shield
Fa Community Shield
Fa Community Shield
Charity Shield 2008
Charity Shield 2008
Fa Community Shield 2008
Events at Wembley Stadium